Josef K were a Scottish post-punk band, active between 1979 and 1982, who released singles on the Postcard Records label. The band was named after the protagonist of Franz Kafka's novel The Trial. Although they released just one album while together and achieved only moderate success, they have since proved influential on many bands that followed.

History
The band was formed in 1979 originally as TV Art by Paul Haig (vocals, guitar) and Ronnie Torrance (drums), later joined by Malcolm Ross (guitar, keyboards), with Gary McCormack added on bass guitar, who soon left (later joining The Exploited) with David Weddell replacing him. They disliked the name and were inspired to change it when they were asked at the last minute to open for the Clash at the Odeon on January 20, 1980 after the original opener dropped out. After recording a ten-track demo, their first release was the "Romance"/"Chance Meeting" single on Orange Juice drummer Steven Daly's Absolute label in December that year. They were then signed to Postcard Records, the label founded by Daly and Alan Horne, releasing a string of critically acclaimed singles in 1980 and 1981. The band recorded their debut album, Sorry for Laughing, in 1981 at Castle Sound Studios in Pencaitland, but it was shelved, with the band unhappy with the clean, polished production, Haig describing it as sounding "flat and disinfected", with only a few copies being released. They returned to the studio in Belgium to record The Only Fun in Town, opting for a more 'live' sound and recording the whole album in two days, Haig later expressing a measure of regret that "we decided to make an almost unlistenable record with the vocals mixed down really low". It was their only album release while together, and while it placed well on the UK Independent Chart, it received a poor critical reception. Their earlier unreleased Sorry For Laughing album was eventually issued on a 1990 CD reissue of The Only Fun in Town and subsequently as its own vinyl LP in 2012 accompanied by a CD of TV Art's early demos. 

The band split prior to the release of the 1982 single, "The Farewell Single" through Les Disques du Crépuscule, which included the Peel session track, "The Missionary", Haig deciding to call an end to the band while they were at a creative peak. Torrance joined Boots for Dancing and later (with Weddell) formed The Happy Family with Nick Currie (aka Momus). Haig embarked on a long solo career, releasing a string of albums on his own Rhythm of Life label between 1984 and 2008, while Malcolm Ross joined Orange Juice and then played with Aztec Camera and Blancmange before embarking on a solo career. Ross and Weddell later reunited in Magic Clan.

Musical style
Musically, they resembled their label mates Orange Juice in fusing post-punk guitars with funk and disco rhythms. They were influenced by American bands such as Pere Ubu, Television, Talking Heads, and The Voidoids, and British bands such as Subway Sect. However, in terms of their lyrics and image Josef K were always far more downbeat and austere than Orange Juice, and were never to match Orange Juice's commercial success. They were also described as sounding similar to Joy Division but "less doomy". Haig was a fan of Joy Division and  "It's Kinda Funny" was inspired by the death of Ian Curtis. Haig's lyrics were also inspired by the works of Franz Kafka, Albert Camus, Hermann Hesse, Fyodor Dostoyevsky, and Knut Hamsun.

The band adopted what was described as an "anti-rock stance", most members eschewing drink and (most) drugs, and the band never doing encores, which Ross considered "patronizing".

Influence
Josef K would prove to be a major influence on several later 1980s bands, including The June Brides and The Wedding Present (who also never do encores). They also influenced later bands such as Franz Ferdinand, The Futureheads, and The Rapture, and they were described in 2006 as "one of the most influential bands in Britain".

"Sorry for Laughing" was covered by German synth pop group Propaganda on their 1985 album A Secret Wish (and the remix album Wishful Thinking), and again in 2004 by French New Wave/bossa nova band Nouvelle Vague.

In an interview with Nardwuar, British musician King Krule stated that Josef K created, "intelligent music and it's coming from a pure place, I think. Any music like, which is real, should get a listen to."

Several notable labels have reissued Josef K albums and compilations, including Creation, Domino and LTM Recordings. In 2014 Les Disques du Crépuscule issued remastered vinyl and CD editions of The Only Fun in Town. The history of Josef K is covered in 2015 documentary film Big Gold Dream, with Malcolm Ross featuring prominently as an interviewee.

Band members
 Paul Haig – guitar, vocals, songwriting
 Malcolm Ross – guitar, violin
 David Weddell – bass
 Ronnie Torrance – drums

Original founding members included Neil Shah-Shah (Guitar) and Matthew Cocks (Bass), who left the band due to increasing press interest.
Gary McCormack briefly played bass before joining The Exploited.

All of their songs were written by either Paul Haig or Paul Haig/Malcolm Ross.

Discography

Studio albums

Compilation and live albums

Singles

¹ post split

References

External links 
 Josef-K.org – official site
 Josef K biography at Crepuscule
 Rhythm of Life Paul Haig's record label
 
 

Scottish new wave musical groups
Scottish post-punk music groups
Scottish indie rock groups
Musical groups disestablished in 1981
Musical groups from Edinburgh